Clarence Elbert Self was a professional American football defensive back and halfback who played in the National Football League. He played six seasons for the Chicago Cardinals (1949), the Detroit Lions (1950–1951), and the Green Bay Packers (1952, 1954–1955).

1948 Football card reads:
All-Star Football Gum
78 ---CLARENCE SELF (TRIGGER)
Halfback -Wisconsin
Weight-170 lbs.  Age-22
Height-5'10"    Year-Senior

He scored six touch downs last season in 9 games. Carried ball 75 times for 526 yards and an outstanding 7.01 average. Ran 78 yards vs. Iowa for TD and 65 yards vs. California for TD. Derived his nickname for his explosive drives through opposition lines. Won 165 lb. Western conference wrestling crown last year. Was unbeaten until Olympic tryouts.

References

1925 births
2012 deaths
Players of American football from Birmingham, Alabama
American football halfbacks
American football defensive backs
Wisconsin Badgers football players
Chicago Cardinals players
Detroit Lions players
Green Bay Packers players